Dr Gonzo is the second studio album by Crookers, which was released on  through Southern Fried Records. It features many collaborations, pre-eminently with Carli, Savage Skulls and Marcus Price.

Track listing

Notes
The instrumental version of "Hummus" was the one featured on the Cream Club Anthems 2012 CD and did not feature the vocals from Hudson Mohawke and Carli. In "Hummus" the word "Dr. Gonzo" is mentioned towards the end of the song and is shortly followed by the word "Again".

References

External links
 
  statistics, tagging and previews at Last.FM
  at iTunes

2011 albums
Crookers albums